Robert Zollitsch (born 9 August 1938) is a German prelate of the Roman Catholic Church. He was Archbishop of Freiburg im Breisgau from 2003 to 2013 and was Chairman of the German Episcopal Conference from 2008 to 2014.

Life and work
Zollitsch was born in Philipsdorf/Filipovo, Yugoslavia (modern-day Serbia), to an ethnic German family of Danube Swabians who moved to Tauberbischofsheim in 1946 after being violently expelled from communist Yugoslavia following World War II. His 16-year-old brother was killed in 1945, after the end of the war, during summary execution massacres by Yugoslav partisans of Josip Broz Tito. Robert Zollitsch, after being educated in several schools, became a member of the Schoenstatt Institute of Diocesan Priests in 1964, and was ordained to the priesthood by Archbishop Hermann Schäufele on 27 May 1965, in the Cathedral of Freiburg im Breisgau

Zollitsch was elected to the general council of the Schoenstatt Institute in both 1974 and 1980. In 1983, he was named archdiocesan personnel manager for Freiburg im Breisgau. He became a member of the cathedral chapter in 1984 as well.

On 16 June 2003, Zollitsch was appointed Archbishop of Freiburg im Breisgau by Pope John Paul II. He received his episcopal consecration on the following 20 July from Archbishop Oskar Saier, with Cardinal Karl Lehmann and Archbishop Giovanni Lajolo serving as co-consecrators. As Archbishop, he leads the second-largest diocese in Germany.

Zollitsch was later elected to succeed Cardinal Lehmann as the Chairman of the German Episcopal Conference, and thus spokesman for the German Church, on 12 February 2008. His election was welcomed by many German figures and groups, including Chancellor Angela Merkel, Lutherans, Social Democrats, and Christian Democrats.

The Archbishop formerly sat on the Permanent Council and the Commission for Clergy, Consecrated Life, and Laity within the same episcopal conference.

Views and positions
Zollitsch is considered to be a liberal in his convictions, and has described himself as being "theologically and personally" close to Cardinal Karl Lehmann.

Zollitsch accepts civil unions by states but is against the term "gay marriage". He favours women becoming deacons.  In 2009, he said in a statement he was working towards damage control in the wake of the controversy over negationist comments made by SSPX bishop Richard Williamson.

In the wake of the ouster of Franz-Peter Tebartz-van Elst as bishop of Limburg, Zollitsch distinguished materialistic ostentation from the cost of supporting the church's ordinary administration: regarding his car, for example, he argued, "To me that car is not a status symbol; it is the office I use when I am traveling."

2010 meeting with Pope Benedict

Archbishop Zollitsch, as head of the German Bishops' Conference, met with the Pope Benedict on Friday 12 March 2010 to further discuss the widening sexual abuse scandal in Germany since January, when former students at Berlin's élite Jesuit high school, Canisius College, went public with accusations against two former priests.

Similar allegations then emerged at other Catholic schools and institutions in Germany, including a Benedictine monastery and several boarding schools. German Justice Minister Sabine Leutheusser-Schnarrenberger condemned the "wall of silence" within the Catholic hierarchy, accusing the church of hiding behind a 2001 Vatican directive that called for cases of abuse to be investigated internally before going to state authorities. "This directive makes clear that even serious abuse allegations fall under papal confidentiality and thus should not be forwarded on outside the church," she said. In this she was misinforming, since the papal confidentiality only applies to matters of the seal of the confessional. While the policy has changed, the Church did not then forward allegations to the public investigators, not due to that decree, but for leaving the matter to the victims; German public law does not demand the crimes in question to be reported.

References

External links

 Catholic-Hierarchy
 Deutsche Welle - "German Catholic Church Begins New Era With Unexpected Chief"
 Schoenstatt Movement

1938 births
Living people
21st-century Roman Catholic archbishops in Germany
Archbishops of Freiburg
Yugoslav people of German descent
Yugoslav emigrants to West Germany
Danube-Swabian people
Members of the Pontifical Council for the Promotion of the New Evangelisation
People from Odžaci
Knights Commander of the Order of Merit of the Federal Republic of Germany
Recipients of the Order of Merit of Baden-Württemberg